Gary Mekikian is an American entrepreneur and investor who is the co-founder and CEO of M&M Media Inc., a Los Angeles-based media technology company.  Prior to M&M Media, Mekikian also co-founded International Integration, Inc. also known as i-Cube; answerfriend, Inc., which became Inquira; and GATeIC, Inc.

Mekikian is a co-organizer of  LA2DC.org, a Los Angeles-based organization whose mission is to raise awareness of modern-day genocides and the Holocaust, and to eliminate genocide as a war tactic.

Mekikian has a BS in Electrical Engineering from the University of Southern California and an MS from Stanford University, and he holds patents in media technologies and medical devices. Mekikian is a member of Stanford University's Graduate School of Business MSx Alumni Advisory Board. He collaborates with Stanford University professors Dr. William Barnett and Dr. John Roberts to write and teach case studies on entrepreneurship, information technology, semiconductor industry, and the mobile internet.

Education
After attending Hollywood High School for two years, Mekikian earned an electrical engineering degree from University of Southern California and an MS from Stanford University.

Career

Early ventures
In 1993, after working at Hewlett-Packard Company as a sales engineer, Mekikian joined the founding team at International Integration Inc., also known as i-Cube, which went public in 1998. i-Cube was acquired by Razorfish, Inc. in 1999.

Mekikian began working with Dr. Deniz Yuret, a researcher in Natural Language Processing at Massachusetts Institute of Technology, and Sundar Subramaniam, a co-founder of i-Cube, to found answerFriend, Inc., which developed commercialized web based question-answering technologies. In 2002, answerFriend merged with another natural language processing technology company, Electric Knowledge, to form InQuira. In 2011, Oracle Corporation acquired Inquira.

In 2006, Mekikian co-founded GATeIC a semiconductor IP company.

M&M Media / Trebel Music
In 2014, after a patent was issued on a new method of delivering and monetizing digital media on mobile and desktop devices, Mekikian co-founded M&M Media, Inc., a digital music distribution company that released the Trebel Music app to reduce digital media piracy by specifically targeting a demographic which uses piracy as a form of digital media consumption.

Genocide Awareness and Prevention 
In 2015, the descendants of the Armenian genocide around the world commemorated the 100 anniversary of the first genocide of the 20th century.  Mekikian, along with a group of American-Armenians, organized an event called LA2DC, a coast-to-coast, running and cycling, relay marathon. The mission is to increase awareness of modern-day genocides, and to stop genocides as a war tactic. Over a thousand athletes ran and cycled non-stop, from Los Angeles to Washington DC, to deliver a petition to Congress - a message of gratitude to Americans and others who worked to prevent genocides, and rescued the survivors. Mekikian and colleagues authored the petition which was delivered in a relay baton to Congressman Adam Schiff who read it on the floor of the House of Representatives on May 20, 2015.

Bibliography
Prof. William Barnett and Gary Mekikian, (2013) Mercado Libre, Leadership and Managing People, Stanford Graduate School of Business
Gary Mekikian and Prof. John Roberts, (2009) Note on IT Services Industry, Economics, Stanford Graduate School of Business
Gary Mekikian and Prof. John Roberts, (2009) Tata Consultancy Services, Globalization of IT Services, Economics,
Prof. William Barnett and Gary Mekikian, (2008) Creating Qualcomm, Organizational Behavior, Entrepreneurship,'' Stanford Graduate School of Business

References

Living people
20th-century American businesspeople
21st-century American businesspeople
American technology chief executives
American technology company founders
Stanford University people
American philanthropists
Year of birth missing (living people)